Clemens Arnold (born 31 January 1978 in Melbourne, Victoria) is a field hockey goalkeeper from Germany, who was born in Australia. He was the goalkeeper for the German Men's National Team from 1998 to 2004. He retired from the national team after winning the bronze medal at the 2004 Summer Olympics in Athens.

International Senior tournaments

 1999 – European Nations Cup, Padua (1st place)
 2000 – Champions Trophy, Amstelveen (2nd place)
 2000 – Summer Olympics, Sydney (5th place)
 2001 – European Indoor Nations Cup, Luzern (1st place)
 2001 – Champions Trophy, Rotterdam (1st place)
 2002 – World Cup, Kuala Lumpur (1st place)
 2002 – Champions Trophy, Cologne (2nd place)
 2003 – European Nations Cup, Barcelona (1st place)
 2004 – Summer Olympics, Athens (3rd place)

References

Arnold Clemens profile

External links

1978 births
Living people
German male field hockey players
Male field hockey goalkeepers
Olympic field hockey players of Germany
Olympic bronze medalists for Germany
Field hockey players at the 2000 Summer Olympics
2002 Men's Hockey World Cup players
Field hockey players at the 2004 Summer Olympics
Field hockey players from Melbourne
Olympic medalists in field hockey
Medalists at the 2004 Summer Olympics
Harvestehuder THC players
21st-century German people